Benedetto Martiali was a Roman Catholic prelate who served as Titular Bishop of Nicopolis ad Iaterum (1471–?).

Biography
On 3 April 1471, Benedetto Martiali was appointed during the papacy of Pope Paul II as Titular Bishop of Nicopolis ad Iaterum.
On 28 April 1471, he was consecrated bishop by Šimun Vosić, Archbishop of Bar, with Giovanni Battista Cibò, Bishop of Savona, and Thomas Ghisleri, Bishop of Jesi, serving as co-consecrators. 
It is uncertain how long he served as Titular Bishop of Nicopolis ad Iaterum; the next bishop of record is André Byssmann who was appointed in 1482.

References 

15th-century Italian Roman Catholic bishops
Bishops appointed by Pope Paul II